Crolles is a commune in the Isère department in southeastern France. It is located in the Isère valley, 20 km northeast of Grenoble, upstream on the river Isère. It has given its name to the Dent de Crolles mountain (2,062 m), which stands just above the city.

Industries
Crolles hosts the biggest semiconductor fabrication plant in France (employing 4,000 people, for a total investment of 3 billion euros). First founded by STMicroelectronics in the 1980s, the recent development (Crolles 2, 2003) results from a joint-venture with Philips (today NXP semiconductors) and Motorola.

Crolles is the birthplace of Petzl, manufacturers of safety equipment for mountaineering, caving and vertical safety in civil engineering, which still has its headquarters there and is also the site of the main manufacturing plant of Teisseire, a beverage company now owned by Britvic.

Population

See also
Communes of the Isère department

References

Communes of Isère
Isère communes articles needing translation from French Wikipedia